Everything's Strange Here is a compilation album by American rapper G-Eazy. Described as a side project, it was released commercially for streaming only on June 26, 2020, via RCA Records. Production was handled by several record producers, including Cole M.G.N., Dakarai Gwitira, Marshmello and Christoph Andersson among others. The project features guest appearances by Kosissko and Ashley Benson.

Track listing

Charts

References

2020 albums
G-Eazy albums
RCA Records albums
Albums produced by Marshmello
Albums produced by Cole M. Greif-Neill